Blueprint Pictures is an independent production company founded in 2005 by producers Graham Broadbent and Peter Czernin. Sony Pictures Television has owned a small stake in Blueprint Television since 2016.

In 2008, Blueprint Pictures produced Martin McDonagh’s film In Bruges, starring Colin Farrell and Brendan Gleeson, in conjunction with Film4 Productions. Blueprint also produced McDonagh's second feature Seven Psychopaths, starring Colin Farrell, Woody Harrelson, and Sam Rockwell.

In 2017, Blueprint produced Martin McDonagh's Three Billboards Outside Ebbing, Missouri with Film4 Productions, starring Frances McDormand, Woody Harrelson, Sam Rockwell, and Peter Dinklage. The film was nominated for seven Academy Awards, won two, and won 5 BAFTAs as well as 4 Golden Globes.

2018 saw the release of Mike Newell’s The Guernsey Literary and Potato Peel Pie Society starring Lily James and Michiel Huisman, and the BBC television show A Very English Scandal, starring Hugh Grant and Ben Whishaw and directed by Stephen Frears.

Other Blueprint productions include The Best Exotic Marigold Hotel and its sequel The Second Best Exotic Marigold Hotel starring Judi Dench and Bill Nighy, The Riot Club starring Sam Claflin, Max Irons, and Douglas Booth and directed by Lone Scherfig, and Becoming Jane starring Anne Hathaway and James McAvoy. Blueprint's first television drama, The Outcast, was shown on BBC1 in 2015.

Filmography

References

Film production companies of the United Kingdom
Sony Pictures Television
2005 establishments in the United Kingdom
Companies based in London
Companies established in 2005